The Lebanese Challenge Cup is a Lebanese football annual cup competition contested by the teams placed between 7th and 10th in the previous season of the Lebanese Premier League and the two newly promoted teams from the Lebanese Second Division. Founded in 2013, the most successful clubs in the competition are Tadamon Sour, Shabab Sahel, Racing Beirut and Bourj, all with two titles each.

Format
The teams placed between 7th and 10th in the previous season of the Lebanese Premier League and the two newly promoted teams from the Lebanese Second Division are split into two groups of three. The first two placed teams in each group qualify to the knock-out stages, where two one-legged semi-finals are disputed. The two winners from the previous round play the final, with the winner being crowned champion of the competition.

Winners and finalists

Winners by year

Results by team

See also 
 Lebanese FA Cup
 Lebanese Super Cup
 Lebanese Elite Cup

References

 
Challenge
Recurring sporting events established in 2013
2013 establishments in Lebanon
Lebanese Premier League